Nudaria suffusa is a moth of the subfamily Arctiinae first described by George Hampson in 1894. It is found in the Indian states of Sikkim and Assam.

References

Nudariina